Route 51 is a three-mile (5 km) road that stretches from the junction Wapaa Road with Route 58 at the Nawiliwili Harbor in Lihue to Route 56 north of Lihue on The Garden Isle.

Route description 
After the junction with Wapaa Road, Route 51 is signed with Rice Street for less than a mile.  Route 51 then splits off with Rice Street and becomes Kapule Highway where the final segment north of the airport was completed in 1988.  The road intersects with Route 570 near the Lihue Airport.  Heading north towards the eastern and northern towns of Kauai, Route 51 ends at the intersection with Route 56.

Major intersections

References

External links

 Info on Hawaii Route 51

0051
Transportation in Kauai County, Hawaii